Bay du Nord may refer to:
Bay du Nord, Hermitage Bay, Newfoundland and Labrador
Bay du Nord, Fortune Bay, Newfoundland and Labrador